Spar Island is a small sandbar in Mount Hope Bay in eastern Rhode Island. The island is more or less a sand bar, and is made up entirely of an intertidal zone. A small portion is visible at high tide, expanding by about 4 times that size at low tide.

References

Islands of Rhode Island
Landforms of Bristol County, Rhode Island
Coastal islands of Rhode Island